Aloysius Ball (7 December 1873 – 1940) was an English footballer who played in the Football League for Leicester Fosse and Preston North End.

References

1873 births
1940 deaths
English footballers
Association football midfielders
English Football League players
Preston North End F.C. players
Kettering Town F.C. players
Leicester City F.C. players
Nelson F.C. players